The Hudson River Valley Institute is a center for regional studies of the Hudson Valley of New York State.  It is an academic extension of Marist College in Poughkeepsie, New York.  The academic institution provides internships for Marist History majors and contributes to local happenings, such as the Walkway Over the Hudson and the Mount Beacon Inclined Railway Restoration Society.  Furthermore, they oversee Marist's publication of the Hudson River Valley Review, a journal of regional studies featuring historical research on the Hudson River Valley.

Founding 
The Hudson River Valley Institute was founded out of the necessity to preserve, protect, and interpret one of only forty Congressionally designated National Heritage Areas. The Hudson River has some of the oldest and most exciting stories to tell of American history, and the HRVI ensures that these stories are being taught.

Hudson River Valley Review 
The Hudson River Valley Review is a journal of regional studies published by the Institute. It was started in the 1980s at Bard College. The Review features articles on the history and heritage of the Hudson River and research on regionalism. It is published twice each year, once in the spring and once in the fall.

Notable Issues 
Among the HRVI's most notable issues are the 2010 Glenn Curtiss edition, 2009 Eleanor Roosevelt edition, 2009 Hudson, Fulton, Champlain Quadricentennial Commemorative edition, and the 2003 American Revolution edition.

Digital Library 
The Digital Library can be found on the HRVI's homepage and it contains summaries of back issues to 2002 for review.

References

Sources

External links 
  

Marist College
Private universities and colleges in New York (state)
Universities and colleges in Dutchess County, New York
Poughkeepsie, New York
Hudson Valley
History magazines published in the United States